A Spanish Peruvian is a Peruvian citizen of Spanish descent. Among European Peruvians, the Spanish are the largest group of immigrants to settle in the country.

History

Early settlers
In 1532, the Spanish conquistadores arrived in Peru. As they began to conquer the country, their culture and influence spread throughout the nation. Not only did their ideology spread, their population did as well. Over the period of the Peruvian colonial era, hundreds of thousands of Spanish immigrants flooded into Peruvian ports. These Spanish-born immigrants, called Peninsulares, caused much friction between themselves and the locally born Spanish criollos or creoles. The peninsulares had a distinctly higher social rank than the criollos even though their only difference was their place of birth. The peninsulares were given the highest governing positions, while the criollos, although much more wealthy than the mestizos and amerindians, did not receive all of the privileges given to the Spain-born Spanish. This would eventually lead to the independence movement in the early 19th century. During the colonial period, the Spanish crown disallowed the immigration of other Europeans to Peru. For this reason, throughout the entire colonial period, up until independence, the European population in Peru was made up solely of Spaniards. Around the time of independence the rate of immigration was low and not many Europeans were entering the country. The nation was, in essence, in a state of chaos, for the reason that the government was still in the process of deciding how it would rule the newly independent country. At this time, many caudillos, or dictators, attempted to assume control of the nation. Some of these attempts, such as that of Simón Bolívar, were met with approval from the public, while others were not.

19th and 20th century
Spanish immigration did not resume until the 1840s at the beginning of the Guano era, one of Peru's most prosperous time periods. During this era, immigration from Spain greatly increased and the economy was booming and standard of living was high. This era ended in 1866 with the Spanish-Peruvian War in which Peru emerged victorious. After the war, immigration decreased although the influx of immigrants remained steady until the 1930s. During the Spanish Civil War, thousands of Spaniards fled from Spain to Peru. Over the course of General Francisco Franco's dictatorship many thousands more fled in fear of the regime. The Spanish republicans fled Franco's regime as well, seeking to escape retribution from the new government. World War II brought the end of Spanish immigration to Peru. Many Spanish Peruvians left the nation in 1960s and 1970s to flee from excessive poverty and dictatorship of Gen. Juan Velasco Alvarado and most of these moved to United States and Spain, while most of the rest to Canada, Australia, New Zealand, and United Kingdom. The second wave of Spanish and other white Peruvians left during the Alan Garcia regime (a Hispanic descendant) that led Peru to extreme poverty and hyperinflation. Nevertheless, immigration from Spain began again in considerable numbers throughout the 20th century due to many Spanish tourists settling in Peru.

Origins and passage
The regions from which most Spanish immigrants originated were Extremadura, Castilla y León, País Vasco, Andalucía, Galicia and Cataluña. Most of the colonial immigrants, in consequence, went from the southern regions of Spain to what now is considered the coastal Peruvian region. These immigrants generally departed from the ports of Cadiz and Sevilla and arrived in the ports of Callao, Mollendo and Pimentel. Many of these immigrants made a stopover in a Caribbean port before arriving in Peru. Before the development of the Panama Canal ships were forced to go around Cape Horn to reach Peruvian ports. Although not many, a few travelers made their way from Europe to Peru via the Amazon River. These immigrants would seek passage on the many commercial ships going to retrieve rubber in Peru to bring back to Europe. These immigrants would arrive at the river port of Iquitos. Almost all of them stayed there. These immigrants numbered no more than a few thousand.

There are also a group of Hebrew origin (Sephardim), although most emigrated in the Colonial era. The Sephardim who emigrated to different countries to late nineteenth and twentieth centuries were mainly from North Africa, Anatolia and the Balkans, and not necessarily from Spain or Portugal. As a result of Alhambra Decree and the conversions due to the Inquisition in Spain, Portugal and its respective colonies since the late fifteenth century until early nineteenth, mostly emigrated to North Africa, regions of the Ottoman Empire and to a lesser extent Italy, although also to the Netherlands, England and its colonies. However, many also migrated to the Spanish or Portuguese colonies in the Americas in Colonial times, most of them marranos. Their descendants are mixed people with local population and profess Christianity, especially Catholicism.

Spanish Peruvian institutions and associations
Fondo de Cooperación Hispano Peruano
Centro Hispano-Peruano
Cooperacion Hispano Peruano
Federación de Asociaciones de Peruanos en España
Embajada De España en Peru
Centro Cultural Hispano Americano
Asociación Hispano-Peruano
Asociación de Genealogía Hispana
Enlace Hispano Americano de Salud
Asociacion de medicos Hispano-Peruanos

Notable Spanish Peruvians

Saint Rose of Lima
Nicolás de Piérola
Mario Vargas Llosa
Claudio Pizarro
Luis Castañeda Lossio
Alan García
José Bernardo de Tagle
José de la Riva Agüero
Luis José de Orbegoso
Manuel Salazar y Baquíjano
Felipe Santiago Salaverry
Juan Crisóstomo Torrico
Francisco Vidal
Manuel Ignacio de Vivanco
Juan Antonio Pezet
Mariano Ignacio Prado
José Balta
Manuel Pardo
Francisco García Calderón
Remigio Morales Bermúdez
Justiniano Borgoño
Manuel Candamo
Eduardo López de Romaña
José Pardo y Barreda
Augusto B. Leguía
Óscar R. Benavides
Manuel Prado Ugarteche
José Bustamante y Rivero
Fernando Belaúnde Terry
Víctor Andrés Belaúnde
Antero Flores Aráoz
Francisco García Calderón Rey
Javier Pérez de Cuéllar
Mariano Eduardo de Rivero y Ustariz
Francisco Morales Bermúdez
Chabuca Granda
María Julia Mantilla
Claudia Ortiz
Miguel Grau Seminario
César Miró
Francisco Miró Quesada Cantuarias
Cayetano Heredia
Alberto Tejada Noriega
Hipólito Unanue
Alberto Bustamante Belaunde
Alfonso Ugarte
Juan Diego Flórez
Susana Villarán
Mercedes Aráoz 
Javier Valle Riestra
Martín Adán
Manuel González Prada

See also
 Peru–Spain relations

References

Ethnic groups in Peru
European Peruvian
 
Peru